IGSO may refer to:

 Inclined geosynchronous orbit, a special type of inclined orbit
 International Geodetic Student Organisation, an organisation run by and for geodesy students and young geodesists